Shawn M. Bouwens (born May 25, 1968) is a former American football guard in the National Football League. He played professionally for the Detroit Lions and Jacksonville Jaguars.

Biography
Bouwens was born in Lincoln, Nebraska and graduated from Lincoln Northeast High School. Bowens attended Nebraska Wesleyan University and was drafted by the New England Patriots in the 9th round (226th overall) of the 1990 NFL Draft.

Bouwens played in the National Football League for five seasons, paying for the Detroit Lions from 1991 to 1994 and the Jacksonville Jaguars in 1995.

References

External links
 Pro-Football-Reference.com
 databaseFoortball.com
 NFL Enterprises LLC

1968 births
Living people
American football offensive guards
Detroit Lions players
Jacksonville Jaguars players
Nebraska Wesleyan Prairie Wolves football players
Sportspeople from Lincoln, Nebraska
Players of American football from Nebraska
Lincoln Northeast High School alumni